Philipp Jakob Becker, a German painter, was born at Pforzheim in 1763. At seventeen years of age he went to Rome, where he studied and formed his style under Raphael Mengs and Maron. In 1785 he returned to Carlsruhe, having acquired in Italy a high degree of skill in every technical requirement of his art. But he was wanting in poetic fancy, and did not succeed in any remarkable manner in oil painting. He died at Erlenbad in 1829. He left a large number of
drawings in crayons and sepia, many of them copies, but all admirable for the taste and finish displayed in their execution. He was for many years Director of all the collections of paintings and engravings of the Grand Duke of Baden.

See also
 List of German painters

References
 

18th-century German painters
18th-century German male artists
German male painters
19th-century German painters
19th-century German male artists
People from Pforzheim
1763 births
1829 deaths